Alberto V. Febbrajo (born 19 July 1944, in Vittorio Veneto) is an Italian legal scholar and sociologist.

Febbrajo studied under the political philosopher Bruno Leoni at the University of Pavia and graduated in Law with a thesis on Max Weber’s sociology of law. He continued his studies at the Universities of Berlin and Freiburg im Breisgau and at the German University of Administrative Sciences in Speyer. He is Professor of Sociology of Law at the University of Macerata, Italy.

Febbrajo has also been Head of the Law Department (1986-1990) and Rector (1991-2003) at the same University.
Heis co-director of the journal “Sociologia del diritto” and editor of the Studies in the Sociology of Law Series (Ashgate). In 2009, he established the Fermo Summer School on legal and sociological aspects of European Governance. At present Febbrajo is coordinator of the "Sociology of Law” section of the Italian Sociological Association.
 
He is well known for introducing in Italy socio-legal authors such as Eugen Ehrlich, Theodor Geiger and Niklas Luhmann.

Selected publications
Funzionalismo strutturale e sociologia del diritto nell’opera di Niklas Luhmann, Milano, Giuffrè, 1975
“European Yearbook in the Sociology of Law”, (edited by), Milano, Giuffrè, 1988, 
State, Law and Economy as Autopoietic Systems. Regulation and Autonomy in a New Perspective, (with G. Teubner), Milano, Giuffrè, 1992, 
“European Yearbook in the Sociology of Law”, (with D. Nelken), Milano, Giuffrè, 1993, 
Social Processes and Patterns of Legal Control, (with D. Nelken and V. Olgiati), Milano, Giuffrè, 2000, 
Cultura giuridica e politiche pubbliche in Italia, (with A. La Spina and M. Raiteri), Milano, Giuffrè, 2006, 
Eugen Ehrlich, Hans Kelsen, Max Weber. Verso un concetto sociologico di diritto, Milano, Giuffrè, 2010, 
Central and Eastern Europe After Transition. Towards a New Socio-legal Semantics, (with W. Sadurski), Farnham, Ashgate, 2010, 
The Financial Crisis in Constitutional Perspective. The Dark Side of Functional Differentiation, (with P. F. Kjaer and G. Teubner), Oxford-Portland (OR), Hart, 2011, 
Law and Intersystemic Communication. Understanding ‘Structural Coupling’, (with G. Harste), Farnham, Ashgate, 2013, 
Sociologia del diritto. Concetti e problemi, Bologna, Il Mulino, 2013, II ed., 
Il diritto frammentato, (with F. Gambino), Milano, Giuffrè, 2014, 
Le radici del pensiero sociologico-giuridico, (edited by), Milano, Giuffrè, 2014, 
Dall'unità alla pluralità del diritto, in Ripensare Max Weber nel centocinquantesimo dalla nascita. Atti dei convegni Lincei, Roma, Scienze e Lettere, 2015, pp. 171–192,

Translations and editions by Febbrajo
E. Ehrlich, I fondamenti della sociologia del diritto (1913), Milano, Giuffrè, 1976
N. Luhmann, Sociologia del diritto (1972), Roma-Bari, Laterza, 1977
N. Luhmann, Sistema giuridico e dogmatica giuridica (1974), Bologna, Il Mulino, 1978
N. Luhmann, Stato di diritto e sistema sociale (1971), Napoli, Guida, 1978
A. Ross, Critica del diritto e analisi del linguaggio, Bologna, Il Mulino, 1982 (with R. Guastini)
N. Luhmann, Sistemi sociali. Fondamenti di una teoria generale (1984), Bologna, Il Mulino, 1990 (with R. Schmidt)
N. Luhmann, Procedimenti giuridici e legittimazione sociale (1983), Milano, Giuffrè, 1995
G. Teubner, Il diritto come sistema autopoietico (1989), Milano, Giuffrè, 1996, (with C. Pennisi)

References

External links 
Docenti.unimc.it

University of Pavia alumni
Italian sociologists
Italian legal scholars
Living people
1944 births
Academic staff of the University of Macerata